Joseph Harron (14 March 1900–1961) was an English footballer who played in the Football League for Barnsley, Hull City, Northampton Town and The Wednesday.

References

1900 births
1961 deaths
English footballers
Association football forwards
English Football League players
Hull City A.F.C. players
Northampton Town F.C. players
York City F.C. players
Sheffield Wednesday F.C. players
Kettering Town F.C. players
Scarborough F.C. players
Dartford F.C. players
Barnsley F.C. players